Nick and Norah's Infinite Playlist is the first collaboration novel written by Rachel Cohn and David Levithan. The novel was published in 2006 by Alfred F. Knopf Books for Young Readers. It was adapted into the 2008 feature film Nick & Norah's Infinite Playlist, which both Levithan and Cohn appear in briefly. 

The novel was in part inspired by Dashiell Hammett's "The Thin Man", though other than the names of the two protagonists bears little resemblance to its inspiration. The chapters from Nick's perspective are written by Levithan while the chapters from Norah's perspective are written by Cohn.

Plot
The novel is told from the alternating perspectives of Nick, the only straight member of a queercore rock band, and Norah, the daughter of a well-known music producer. After a concert, Nick sees his ex-girlfriend in the bar and asks Norah to pretend to be his girlfriend for five minutes. Norah agrees but only because she wants to find a ride for her very drunk friend Caroline. Through myriad circumstances, Nick and Norah find themselves spending the rest of the night together, heading to a strip club to watch nuns gyrate to The Sound of Music and sneaking into a hotel to make out. At the end of the novel, they decide that perhaps they don't know what the future holds, but they are willing to give this relationship a try.

References

2006 American novels
American LGBT novels
American novels adapted into films
Collaborative novels
Novels about music
Novels by David Levithan
Novels by Rachel Cohn